Wépion is a district of the city of Namur, Wallonia, Belgium.

The strawberry has been cultivated there for more than 150 years because Wépion benefits from a micro-climate, sun-exposed plantations on west sloping ground and has a perfect ground for this type of culture.

It produces a strawberry beer under the brand name La Wépionnaise.

See also
Wépion strawberry
 La Pairelle

References

External links 
 
Brief details & photo

Sub-municipalities of Namur (city)
Former municipalities of Namur (province)